Alberdi may refer to:

Alberdi (surname)
Alberdi Department, Santiago del Estero Province, Argentina
Alberdi, Paraguay, a city in the Ñeembucú Department

See also
Barrio Alberdi, a neighbourhood in Rosario, Argentina
Mount Usborne, the Spanish name is Cerro Alberdi, on the East Falkland Island